Derek Doyle (born 30 April 1986) is an Irish footballer who plays for League of Ireland First Division club Drogheda United. Doyle plays as a left-sided winger and has experience playing as a striker.

Career
Doyle was born in Dublin, and began his senior career with University College Dublin A.F.C. on a soccer scholarship. He made his debut for the Students as a 19-year-old coming on as a second-half substitute during a 1–1 league draw against Shelbourne on 3 June 2005 at Belfield Park and he scored his first goal against the same opposition at the same venue the following season on 22 April 2006. Doyle earned a reputation as an attacking midfielder contributing 11 goals and numerous assists during his spell at Belfield Park before a leg-break in a league fixture against Sligo Rovers in 2007 curtailed that season. He also won two successive Dr. Tony O'Neill Under 21 League titles with UCD in both 2004 and 2005. After 4 years with the Belfield club, Doyle departed UCD who were at the foot of the Premier Division table midway through the 2008 season to join First Division title contenders Dundalk. Doyle made his Dundalk debut as second-half substitute against Wexford Youths at Oriel Park on 31 July 2008 in a 1–0 victory for the Lilywhites. He scored his first Dundalk goal in a 2–2 away draw to Athlone Town at Lissywollen on 8 September 2008. Doyle's move to Dundalk turned out to be an astute move as he contributed 3 goals in 11 appearances as the Lilywhites dramatically took the First Division title on the final night of the season.

Despite Dundalk's success in securing the First Division title and promotion to the Premier Division, Doyle was one of 19 first team players not offered a new contract for Dundalk's 2009 campaign. It was not long before Doyle found himself a new club, he signed for Shelbourne on 23 December 2008 aiming to win his second successive First Division title for 2009. Doyle made his Shelbourne debut on 6 March 2009 as a second-half substitute during a 2–1 victory over Wexford Youths at Tolka Park. He scored his first Shelbourne goal on 24 April 2009 during a 2–0 league victory over Athlone Town at Tolka Park. Doyle made a total of 27 competitive appearances for Shelbourne in 2009, scoring 3 goals as Shelbourne finished First Division runners-up. He parted company with Shelbourne at the end of 2009 and he subsequently linked up with his former UCD manager Pete Mahon at St. Patrick's Athletic for the 2010 Premier Division season. Derek scored a hat-trick against Galway United FC in a 4–2 win for the supersaints on 2 July 2010 as the saints came from 2–1 down to win.
In the 2011 season he started the season well chipping in with goals from the left wing. On 7 July 2011 Doyle scored the winner in their Europa League game against Íþróttabandalag Vestmannaeyja with a close range header. Doyle also scored in their next Europa League qualifier against FC Shakhter Karagandy.

Honours
UCD
Under 21 League of Ireland (2): 2004, 2005

Dundalk
League of Ireland First Division (1): 2008

St Patrick's Athletic
Leinster Senior Cup (1): 2011

References

External links
Derek Doyle's profile at www.shelbournefc.com
Derek Doyle's profile at www.ucdsoccer.com

1986 births
Living people
Republic of Ireland association footballers
Association footballers from County Dublin
St Patrick's Athletic F.C. players
Shelbourne F.C. players
University College Dublin A.F.C. players
Dundalk F.C. players
Drogheda United F.C. players
League of Ireland players
Cherry Orchard F.C. players
Association football wingers